Sergio "Serging" Veloso Osmeña Jr. (December 4, 1916 – March 26, 1984) was a Filipino politician who served as a Senator of the Philippines, and ran against Ferdinand Marcos in the 1969 Philippine Presidential election. He was the son of Sergio Osmeña, the fourth president of the Philippines. His son, Sergio "Serge" Osmeña III, was also a Senator of the Philippines.

Early life
Osmeña was born in the town of Cebu on December 4, 1916, to Sergio Osmeña Sr., then the House Speaker and representative from the 2nd district of Cebu, and Estefania Chiong Veloso. He had a brother, Emilio Osmeña, father of Emilio Mario Osmeña Jr. and John Henry Osmeña. He graduated Associate of Arts, cum laude, from Ateneo de Manila University on 1935, and Bachelor of Science in commerce, summa cum laude, from New York University in 1936. After graduating which Osmeña opened an import-export business in New York.

Actions in World War II
Osmeña collaborated with the Japanese in World War II. He escaped justice  and returned to the Philippines and became President of the De La Rama Steamship Company.

Political career

In 1951, he was elected provincial governor of Cebu and Mayor of Cebu City for three terms in 1955, 1959 and 1963. Elected as representative for the second district of Cebu in 1958, his notable work as fiscalizer brought him recognition from the Congressional Press Club which voted him as one of the Ten Most Outstanding Congressmen of 1959.

In 1961, Osmeña ran for Vice President of the Philippines as an independent, but lost to Senator Emmanuel Pelaez. In the November 1965 elections, he won a seat in the Philippine Senate.

1969 Philippine Presidential election

Osmeña publicly opposed the Marcos administration.

On April 5, 1969, at the St. Francis Hotel, San Francisco, Marcos Exposed Osmeña of collaborating with the Japanese in World War II.

Later on June 15, Osmeña won the Liberal Party nomination for President of the Philippines, and would run against incumbent President Ferdinand Marcos for the 1969 Philippine presidential election. Marcos spent US$50 million in infrastructure projects in an effort to improve the country. This rapid campaign spending was so massive that it would be responsible for the Balance of Payments Crisis of 1970, whose inflationary effect would cause social unrest leading all the way up to the proclamation of Martial Law in 1972. Marcos was reported to have spent PhP 100 for every PhP 1 that Osmena spent, using up PhP 24 Million in Cebu alone.

Subsequent activities
Following his presidential loss, Osmeña continued as a leader in the Liberal Party.

On August 21, 1971, Osmeña along with prominent members of the Liberal Party held a proclamation rally at the Plaza Miranda in Quiapo. While on stage with the other Liberal leaders, two hand grenades were thrown on stage, injuring Osmeña. The Plaza Miranda bombing, injured 95, including Osmeña, and killed 9. Afterwards, Osmeña left for the United States and lived in Beverly Hills, Los Angeles, California.

Marcos proclaimed martial law in September 1972 and submitted documents to the U.S. Congress, he declared martial law due to a communist threat of the Communist Party of the Philippines and the rebellion of the Muslim Independence Movement, the documents charged that declaration of martial law was also due to a plot to kill Marcos. Osmeña was a key figure in the plot, although no formal charges were filed against him.

Personal life

He was married to Lourdes de la Rama of Negros Occidental with whom he had five children: Sergio III ("Serge"), Tomas ("Tommy"), Maria Victoria ("Minnie"), Esteban ("Stevie"), and Georgia.

Death
Osmeña died of respiratory failure at the age of 67 on March 26, 1984, at Cedars Sinai Medical Center in Los Angeles, California.

Historical commemoration
In 2014, a life-size brass statue of Osmeña was erected at Plaza Sugbu in Cebu City. It was designed by national artist for sculpture Eduardo Castrillo and commissioned by Insular Life.

References

1916 births
1984 deaths
Ateneo de Manila University alumni
Candidates in the 1969 Philippine presidential election
Cebuano people
Children of presidents of the Philippines
Deaths from respiratory failure
Filipino Roman Catholics
Governors of Cebu
Independent politicians in the Philippines
Liberal Party (Philippines) politicians
Mayors of Cebu City
Members of the House of Representatives of the Philippines from Cebu
New York University Stern School of Business alumni
Sergio
People from Cebu City
Candidates in the 1961 Philippine vice-presidential election
Senators of the 6th Congress of the Philippines
Senators of the 7th Congress of the Philippines
Filipino collaborators with Imperial Japan